The NI tank (tank NI, abbr.

Development

At the beginning of the war between the Axis and the Soviet Union, a majority of the factories were evacuated, including most of the equipment from the January Uprising Factory. There was machinery left and it was decided that it would be used to service battle-damaged tanks arriving from the front.

When the army fighting on the outskirts of Odessa (the city defences held out for seventy-two days before the army pulled back) started experiencing shortages in tanks, the workers from the factory decided to build a fighting vehicle of their own design. Aided by the workers from other factories, the workers of the January Uprising factory built a large metal box and mounted it on the tractor. Also added was a traversable turret with either a mountain gun or a large-calibre machine gun. The armour was a sandwich of thin naval steel or boiler plate and wood or rubber sheeting to improve protection against small arms. The resulting machine was one of the many different improvised fighting vehicles developed during the war; however it was unlike any other fighting vehicle of the time due to its sizeable production and loud noise when it moved.

Armament was varied to whatever was on hand during the siege, including machine guns, the ShVAK cannon, sub-turrets from T-26 Model 1931 tanks, new turrets with 37 mm Model 15R mountain guns or 45 mm anti-tank guns.

Production history

During the siege of Odessa, a total of 69 NI tanks were produced. These then fought during the siege against the Axis forces in support of soviet troops.

Combat use
68 NI tanks (all but one) were captured by the Axis-aligned Romanians by the end of the siege, with 14 still being on hand as of 1 November 1942.

See also

Tanks of comparable role, performance, and era 

 New Zealand Bob Semple tank
 New Zealand Schofield tank
 Soviet KhTZ-16
 Polish Kubuś armoured car
 British Bison concrete armoured lorry

References

 
  (in Russian)
 Zaloga, Steven J., James Grandsen (1984). Soviet Tanks and Combat Vehicles of World War Two, p. 142. London: Arms and Armour Press. .

External links
 Bronetraktory — Combat tractors, part 3 (in Russian)
 http://www.tanks-encyclopedia.com/ww2/soviet/soviet_NI_Odessa_tank.php - Probably the most detailed and extensive account on the NI tank available in English.

World War II tanks of the Soviet Union
Improvised armoured fighting vehicles
World War II armoured fighting vehicles of the Soviet Union